Universal Warning Records is a record label and video production company located in the greater Philadelphia area. Universal Warning produces and releases independent music from local and national bands, as well as produces music videos, live concerts for DVD and digital transmission as well as music documentaries, primarily from the indie, punk, and hardcore genres.

History

The label was established in the Spring of 2000 by founders Tim Martinkovich, Mike Varga, and Clint Weiler.  The three met while studying at Kutztown University.  The label was created as a foundation for the partners' punk-alternative band The Covert Agency and to promote area acts that the partners appreciated.

After releasing a compilation of regional Pennsylvanian bands entitled The Warning Compilation during the founders last year in Kutztown, Martinkovitch moved the label and started their first office in Denver Colorado in Summer 2001. Universal Warning Records went on to release full lengths of several Colorado bands such as ManAlive! and Against Tomorrow's Sky. Later that year the label branched out and began signing artists as far south as Louisiana, where Victim of Modern Age ruled the Lafayette scene.

In the Spring of 2008, Weiler left his position as publicist for the label to pursue free lance work and business ventures including a bobble head company called Aggronautix.

Since its foundation in 2000, Universal Warning Records has had offices in Denver, Colorado, Richmond, Virginia and Royersford, Pennsylvania

To date, the label has released 19 CDs, 4 records, and 4 DVDs and filmed nearly 100 live shows including Earth Crisis and Sick of it All.

In May 2011, Universal Warning Records had its 10-year anniversary and the upstart of two new label imprints Fast Break Entertainment and Candy Colored Dragon.

Industry relationships

 Universal Warning Records got their start releasing music by working with Ryan Fennical and his Marshalls Creek area recording studio.
 The label has had a close relationship with popular Philadelphia indie rockers The Jazz June and their subsequent incarnation Snakes & Music, having released albums and DVDs by the band.
 Universal Warning Records media has been distributed by Initial Records, Revelation Records, Lumberjack Distribution, Revolver, Very, Choke, Music Video Distributors, Carrot Top, and Hostile City Distribution.
 Founder Mike Varga also owned Grata Video and produced or worked on videos and DVDs for Andrew W.K., DEVO, Dr. Dog and The Queers

Discography

Music videos

Victim of Modern Age: Instruct to Destruct
Holiday Bodybag: Dead Leaves
American Speedway: Ship of Fools
Fifty Caliber Kiss: Hide the Razor
Wisdom In Chains: Back To The Ocean
Wisdom In Chains: Chasing The Dragon

Media released on other labels
Sick of it All “New York vs London” (released as a CD/DVD combo w/ Based on a True Story (Sick of It All album) Century Media

References

External links
 

American independent record labels
Companies based in Montgomery County, Pennsylvania
Record labels established in 2000
2000 establishments in Pennsylvania